Bullock Correctional Facility is a medium level security Alabama Department of Corrections prison in unincorporated Bullock County, Alabama, near Union Springs.

The prison has an honor/faith dorm and a mental health dorm, and facilities for administrative and disciplinary purposes. Prison programs include substance abuse, general education, mental health, and religious programs.

History
The prison first opened in April 1987. it was used as a minimum prison

References

External links

"Bullock Correctional Facility." Alabama Department of Corrections.

Buildings and structures in Bullock County, Alabama
Prisons in Alabama
1987 establishments in Alabama
State government buildings in Alabama